Thure Valdemar Lindgren (18 April 1921 – 2 September 2005) was a Swedish ski jumper who won an individual silver medal in the large hill at the 1950 World Championships. He finished 40th in the normal hill at the 1952 Winter Olympics.

References

External links

1921 births
2005 deaths
People from Kiruna Municipality
Swedish male ski jumpers
Olympic ski jumpers of Sweden
Ski jumpers at the 1952 Winter Olympics
FIS Nordic World Ski Championships medalists in ski jumping
Sportspeople from Norrbotten County